Arthur Buchanan may refer to:

Arthur S. Buchanan (1856–1919), Justice of the Tennessee Supreme Court
A. L. H. Buchanan (1866–1925), Coalition Unionist Party MP for Coatbridge